Victor Thibault (born 8 March 1867 in Paris, date of death unknown) was a French competitor in the sport of archery.  Thibault competed in two events at the 1900 Summer Olympics, and won second prize in each. He is now considered by the International Olympic Committee to have won two silver medals.  Both of Thibault's events were the shorter 33 metre competitions, in both the Au Chapelet and Au Cordon Doré style.

Notes
  Prizes at the time were silver medals for first place and bronze medals for second, as well as usually including cash awards.  The current gold, silver, bronze medal system was initiated at the 1904 Summer Olympics.  The International Olympic Committee has retroactively assigned medals in the current system to top three placers at early Olympics.

References

External links

 

1867 births
Year of death missing
Archers at the 1900 Summer Olympics
Olympic archers of France
French male archers
Olympic silver medalists for France
Olympic medalists in archery
Medalists at the 1900 Summer Olympics
Sportspeople from Paris
Place of death missing